Definitive stamps of Russia are the regular postage stamp issues produced in the Russian Empire and RSFSR between 1857 and 1923, and in the Russian Federation since 1992.

Russian Empire 

The Russian Empire started issuing definitive series of postage stamps since 10 December 1857 when the first Russian stamp went on sale. There were twenty definitive issues produced until 1917 as outlined in a table below.

RSFSR 
The first definitive series of the RSFSR was issued in 1921. The stamps had a minimum wording,  (Pochta (postage)) and the acronym  (RSFSR), imparting the Soviet messages solely via pictures.

The first regular issue involved eleven different stamps of denominations ranging between 1- and 1,000 roubles. Among these, five stamps showed the agricultural-labour design, printed in different colours and with face values of 1-, 2-, 100-, 200-, and 300 roubles. The industrial-labour symbol was given in three denominations: 5-, 500-, and 1,000 roubles. The stamp for science-and-arts appeared only once. To a certain degree, designs of the series, focusing more on agriculture and industry, were in conformity with the spirit of the government's New Economic Policy of 1921 aimed at recovering the RSFSR economy. They also followed the same vogue that could be found in Soviet poster art in 1921, when the Soviet government, "having secured its own position, turns to problems of peaceful social and economic development (economic and cultural themes move rapidly to the fore)."

Reflecting new political goals, RSFSR postage stamps provided visual messages of the values and major social groups within Soviet society. Portraying the three social groups, the RSFSR's final definitive issues in 1922 and 1923 depicted the worker, the soldier, and the peasant that constituted the Soviet state. These were stylistic representations in the form of classical busts resembling portraits of monarchs and other heads of state on stamps of other countries.

Replacing the portraits of the tsars, depiction of the three social groups was on purpose, because the Soviet government "specifically decided to create images which would symbolise the idea of worker-peasant power." The sculptor Ivan Shadr was author of these images. Designing the busts, he created the worker first, then the Red Army soldier. These two stamps appeared in December 1922. The stamp showing the bust of the peasant came out five months later, in May 1923. Among the eleven denominations of the fourth definitive issue, the worker appeared on stamps three times, the soldier six times, and the peasant showed up on two stamps.

The Soviet Russia definitive issues are listed in the following table:

Soviet Union 

Between 1923 and 1992, definitive stamps were issued by the USSR postal administration. There were 13 definitive issues of the Soviet Union.

Russian Federation 
In 1992–2010, the Russian Federation produced six issues of definitive stamps. The first post-Soviet issue appeared in February 1992. It included two stamps with face values of 20- and 30 kopecks that depicted Saint George and the Millennium of Russia monument. In the early and mid 1990s, this definitive series of stamps continuously expanded due to hyperinflation and a corresponding change in postal rates. Many stamps were reissued using the same design but with a modified denomination. For example, the face value of the stamp with the Golden Gate in Vladimir increased from 10 kopecks to 150 roubles, that is, by 1500 times. The maximum stamp denomination reached 5,000 roubles.

The second and third issues of definitive stamps came out in 1997–1999. Landscape orientation of stamps was replaced with portrait one. The second series included 12 denominations, and the third one had 15 denominations. By design, stamps of two issues were not different from each other. The need for the third issue was caused by a 1,000-fold of the Russian rouble redenomination followed by withdrawal of the second definitive issue in 1998. The third issue repeated the second one (except the abolished face value of 75 kopecks) and supplemented them with four other denominations. The latter included the denominations of 50- and 100 roubles that did not have practical application.

The fourth series of 2002–2003 was different from the previous issues because of introduction of self-adhesive stamps. The new stamp motives included palaces and parks of Russia. Number of denominations was reduced to nine, from 1- to 10 roubles. The problem of fractional postal rates was solved by using the remaining stamps of the third issue.

Stamps of the fifth, "animalistic" issue of 2008 were not self-adhesive and went back to standard size. Number of denominations again increased to 15, with certain fractional denominations (15, 25, and 30 kopecks) being of dubious practical value. Maximum stamp denomination increased to 25 roubles.

The sixth series of 2009, "Russian Kremlins", represented a return to the self-adhesive stamps with most used denominations. The difference from the fourth issue, of a close topic, was the expansion of denominations up to 100 roubles as well as the availability of additional security features to protect against counterfeiting.

Definitive issues of the Russian Federation are summarised in a table below:

See also

Notes

References

External links 

 
 http://stampsoftheworld.co.uk/wiki/Category:Russia

 
Postage stamps of the Soviet Union
Lists of postage stamps
1857 introductions